Artension is a North American neoclassical progressive metal band, founded in 1993 by  keyboardist Vitalij Kuprij. The band split up after recording seven albums from 1996 to 2004, but reformed in 2016 with the intention of releasing an eighth album.

History
It was sometime in '92/'93, when Vitalij Kuprij, who was studying classical music in Switzerland at that time, met Roger Staffelbach, a Swiss guitarist who was also studying at the Jazz School in Lucerne.

They soon founded their band "Atlantis Rising", which played several instrumental gigs in Switzerland. After having recorded some demos, they got in touch with Mike Varney of Shrapnel Records, who showed great interest in the band but suggested to add some vocal lines to their songs.

Vitalij had already known stunning drummer Mike Terrana from one of Yngwie Malmsteen's tours. His friend, bassist Kevin Chown, also joined the band and enriched their sound with solid experience and great musicianship, and Artension was born.

Mike Varney introduced Vitalij and Roger to several musicians, one of them being John West, whose soaring vocals, along with Vitalij's and Roger's lightning-fast solos, became the trademark for Artension's neo-classical and aggressive music.

Line-up

Current members
 John West - Vocals (1996–2005, 2016-present)
 Roger Staffelbach - Guitar (1993–2005, 2016-present)
 Vitalij Kuprij - Keyboard (1993–2005, 2016-present)
 Chris Caffery - Guitar (2016-present)

Former members
 Steve DiGiorgio - Bass (2004–2005)
 Mike Terrana - Drums (1996–1998, 2001–2005)
 Kevin Chown - Bass (1996–1998, 2001–2004)
 John Onder - Bass (1999–2000)
 Shane Gaalaas - Drums (1999–2000)

Discography
  Into the Eye of the Storm  (1996)
  Phoenix Rising  (1997)
  Forces of Nature  (1999)
  Machine  (2000)
  Sacred Pathways  (2001)
  New Discovery  (2002)
  Future World  (2004)

References

External links 
 
 John West's official home page

American progressive metal musical groups
Musical groups established in 1993
Musical groups disestablished in 2004
1993 establishments in the United States